is a railway station on the Hokuriku Main Line in the city of Awara, Fukui, Japan, operated by West Japan Railway Company (JR West).

Lines
It is also scheduled to become a station on the high-speed Hokuriku Shinkansen line when the extension west of  opens around 2025.

Station layout 
The station has two island platforms with four tracks connected by a footbridge. It has a "Midori no Madoguchi" staffed ticket office.

Platforms

History
It was renamed Awaraonsen Station on 15 March 1972. With the privatization of JNR on 1 April 1987, the station came under the control of JR West.

Passenger statistics
In fiscal 2016, the station was used by an average of 1,822 passengers daily (boarding passengers only).

Surrounding area
Awara City Hall

See also
 List of railway stations in Japan

References

External links

  

Stations of West Japan Railway Company
Railway stations in Fukui Prefecture
Railway stations in Japan opened in 1897
Hokuriku Main Line
Awara, Fukui